Bushells Ridge is a northern suburb of the Central Coast region of New South Wales, Australia. It is part of the  local government area.

It has been earmarked as an Aboriginal Employment Zone & earmarked for development.

References

Suburbs of the Central Coast (New South Wales)